Louisa Puller (1884-1963) was a British artist who contributed works to both the Recording Britain scheme and to the War Artists' Advisory Committee during the Second World War.

Biography

Puller travelled widely throughout England during World War Two on behalf of Recording Britain, depicting the impact of war in at least nine different counties and was among the most prolific artists employed by the scheme. For Recording Britain, Puller was sent at short notice to the village of Sudbourne in Suffolk, arriving just hours before it was appropriated for tank training by the British Army and the local population departed. Her other contributions included six studies of Tetbury in Gloucestershire. The War Artists' Advisory Committee, WAAC, purchased two watercolours by Puller of bomb damage in the City of London. Her work for Recording Britain is now part of the collection of the Victoria & Albert Museum, while the Imperial War Museum holds the paintings purchased from her by WAAC.

Puller appears to have been an amateur artist, with no record of having a professional artistic career. In 1913 she was living in Elsecar near Barnsley and in 1926 she designed a number of panels for an illustrated, limited edition book about Wilthamstow and Highham. In 1940 Puller had one work shown in a Royal Academy exhibition and appeared to be living in London at that time.

References

External links

  Works by Puller in the Victoria & Albert Museum
  Works held by the Imperial War Museum

1884 births
1963 deaths
20th-century British painters
20th-century British women artists
British war artists
British women painters
World War II artists